Armoy was a station which served Armoy in County Antrim, Northern Ireland. It was located on the Ballycastle Railway, a narrow gauge railway line which ran from Ballycastle to Ballymoney, entirely in County Antrim, Northern Ireland.

History
The station was opened by the Ballycastle Railway. Following absorption of the BR into the LMS(NCC), the station then passed to the Ulster Transport Authority under whose management it was closed in July 1950.

References

Disused railway stations in County Antrim
Railway stations opened in 1880
Railway stations closed in 1950
Railway stations in Northern Ireland opened in the 19th century